Stuart Besser is a film producer with more than 25 years of experience and has appeared as an actor in one film, Identity.

Filmography as producer
The People Under the Stairs
The Break-Up
Vampire in Brooklyn
Dr. Giggles
Love at Large
Mile 22
The Invaders
Scream
Scream 3
Molly's Game
The Trial of the Chicago 7
Being the Ricardos

External links

American film producers
American male film actors
Year of birth missing (living people)
Living people